Tuff Gong Worldwide is a record label formed by Ziggy Marley. He used the same name as his father's label, but changed the word international to worldwide.

History
Ziggy Marley started the label under his father's name, changing the international to worldwide. He started the label to do what his father, Bob Marley, couldn't do and make a label that does more than just his own work.

In 2006, Ziggy Marley released his second solo album as the first album on the label. The same year, he released a live version of the album on both CD and DVD. Also that year, a compilation album titled "Ziggy Marley in Jamaica" got released where Ziggy Marley released rare reggae classics.

In 2009, Ziggy Marley released a live album as part of iTunes's  "Live from SoHo" series. He released his first children's album titled "Family Time" on the label.

In 2010, he released another compilation album titled "Dancehall Originators" that featured Original Dancehall mixes.

Discography
 2003: Dragonfly
 2006: Love Is My Religion
 2008: Love Is My Religion Live
 2008:  Ziggy Marley in Jamaica
 2009: Ziggy Live From Soho
 2009: Family Time
 2009: Tuff Gong Worldwide Music Sampler
 2010: Dancehall Originators
 2011: Wild and Free
 2013: In Concert
 2014: Fly Rasta
 2016 Ziggy Marley

Reggae record labels